A by-election for the seat of Flynn in the Northern Territory Legislative Assembly was held on 10 September 1988. The by-election was triggered by the resignation of Country Liberal Party (CLP) member Ray Hanrahan, a former Deputy Chief Minister. The seat had been held by Hanrahan since its creation in 1987.

Results

References

2003 elections in Australia
Northern Territory by-elections
2000s in the Northern Territory